Energy in Yemen describes energy and electricity production, consumption and import in Yemen. Yemen is net energy exporter.

Primary energy use in Yemen was 87 TWh and 4 TWh/million people in 2008 and 88 TWh (4 TWh/M) in 2009.

Overview 

According to the World Bank, Yemen has the lowest level of electricity connection in the Middle East, with only 40% of the population having access to electricity. Rural areas are particularly badly affected. Industrial concerns, hospitals and hotels have their own back-up generators. To address these shortages, a 340-MW gas-fired power plant is currently under construction-and close to completion-at Marib. Further expansion to the facility, which will add an additional 400 MW of output, is already planned. Yemen has received considerable support for the development of its power generation network in recent years, with contributions coming from Saudi Arabia, France, the US, as well as multilateral donors such as the World Bank. Consequently, a National Rural Electrification Program is now in place and the construction of three substations, along with the necessary transmission lines, is currently under way. Yemen is also looking into the development of wind power, although plans for the construction of a nuclear power generating facility have been shelved. Electrical production is 5.665 billion kWh (2007 estimate). Electrical consumption is about 4.133 billion kWh.

Yemen population increased 16.0% in five years 2004-2009. According to OECD/World Bank population growth in Yemen was from 20 million to 24 million in 6 years (2004-2010).

Business
Yemen LNG (YLNG) is the first Liquefied natural gas (LNG) project in Yemen.

See also 

 Economy of Yemen#Oil and gas
 Economy of Yemen#Energy

References